GoCar is the first Carsharing service in Ireland. GoCar members can book cars online or via the app for as little as an hour, then unlock with their phone or GoCard; the keys are in the car, with fuel, insurance and city parking all included. Rates start from €8 per hour, with 50 km of driving included on each trip. GoCar now has over 10,000 members and operates a fleet of over 300 cars across 200+ locations in Ireland. Drivers can visit GoCar.ie to request a GoCar in their community.  It launched in Cork in September 2008, with the support of Cork City Council as a pilot scheme. Cork City Council gave GoCar use of 3 car parking locations in Cork City as part of a wider pilot scheme.

Carsharing contributes to sustainable transport because it is a less car intensive means of urban transport, and according to The Economist, carsharing can reduce car ownership at an estimated rate of one rental car replacing 15 owned vehicles. Carsharing can provide numerous transportation, land use, environmental, and social benefits. Neighborhood carsharing is often promoted as an alternative to owning a car where public transit, walking, and cycling can be used most of the time and a car is only necessary for out-of-town trips, moving large items, or special occasions. It can also be an alternative to owning multiple cars for households with more than one driver. A long-term study of City CarShare members found that 30 percent of households that joined sold a car; others delayed purchasing one. Transit use, bicycling, and walking also increased among members. A study of driving behavior of members from major carsharing organizations found an average decline in 27% of annual vehicle kilometres travelled (VKT).

Investment
GoCar teamed up with Cambio CarSharing to provide the service. Cambio are one of Europe's largest Carsharing providers currently based in Germany and Belgium. During June 2012, GoCar was relaunched in the Mansion House Dublin by the Lord Mayor of Dublin, Andrew Montague. GoCar announced that it had received significant funding from the owners of Irish Car Rentals which would allow the company expand to having 200 cars on the road by the end of 2013.

Dublin City Council by-laws
On 1 August 2013, Dublin City Council's new by-laws in relation to car clubs came into effect. GoCar was presented with the city's first on-street Car Club licence on the same day. To coincide with the announcement of this development, GoCar increased its number of cars in Dublin to 50, with 31 of these cars availing of the new on-street licence in 32 locations around Dublin.

All of these new locations are highly visible and convenient, and won't be liable for on-street car parking charges. This means, a GoCar with this licence can be parked anywhere in the city and not have to pay parking.

"Dublin City Council wants Car Clubs operating from on-street parking spaces because we believe they will play an important role in improving traffic management in the city. Research shows that the number of miles people drive goes down and there is an increase in walking and cycling as Car Clubs become established." (Dublin's Lord Mayor Oisín Quinn)

Dublin City Council sees numerous benefits in Car Clubs, including:

 Each car can be accessed by multiple drivers
 Car Clubs reduce the requirement for private transport
 Car Clubs will help reduce the number of cars in Dublin
 The vehicles used by car clubs are newer than the average car, and therefore more environmentally friendly and safer

GoCar Fleet
90% of the GoCar fleet are low emission vehicles. Currently the fleet consists of a range of cars including:

 Hyundai i20
 Hyundai i30
 Hyundai Kona
 Nissan Micra
 Renault Trafic
 Ford Transit Connect
 Renault Clio
 BMW i3 EV
Nissan Leaf
Hyundai Kona EV

Current Locations

Dublin

Cork

The full list of GoCar locations can be found at https://www.gocar.ie/locations/

References

External links
GoCar Website

Carsharing
Transport in County Tipperary
Transport companies of the Republic of Ireland